Chydenius is a surname. Notable people with the surname include:

Anders Chydenius (1729–1803), Finnish priest and politician
Jussi Chydenius (born 1972), Finnish musician and composer, son of Kaj
Kaj Chydenius (born 1939), Finnish composer